Zhou Shutao (Chinese: 周叔弢) (July 18, 1891, Yangzhou – February 14, 1984, Tianjin) was a collector of rare books, an industrialist, and the deputy mayor of Tianjin.

His names 

Zhou was born Zhou Mingyang, then changed to Zhou Mingxian. Shutao was his style, that he primarily used. He also used an alternate name taken at older age: Shuweng.

Early life 

Zhou was home schooled since 5 years-old in Yangzhou, and collected books from 1912 until 1984.

Private life 

He was the major figure and shareholder in his uncle Zhou Xuexi's empire. A successful industrialist in his own right, he managed Huzxin Textile Co. and Qixin Cement Co. (Wade–Giles: Chee Hsin; Chinese: 启新洋灰).

Public life 

Due to his favorable view of the communist party and cooperation, he was appointed the first deputy mayor of Tianjin in 1950. Since then, he was elected or appointed to numerous organizations that included:
Vice-Chairman of the CPPCC Committee
Standing Committee of the National People's Congress
Vice-Chairman of the National Federation of Industry
Director of CITIC Group Tianjin

Book collection 

He began to collect books in 1912 and to donate in 1949. He accumulated more than 37,000 books, of which 2,672 were rare. He collected Chinese and foreign, dating back to Song dynasty. He donated the entire rare book collection to National Library of China in 1952. His other books, Chinese and foreign, thread - bound to Tianjin Library and Nankai University.

Publications 
1984, Selected donated seals of Zhou Shutao, Zhou Shutao xian sheng juan xian xi yin xuan (Tianjin yi shu bo wu guan)
1985, Index of his rare book Zi zhuang yan kan shanben shumu Tianjin: Guji Chubanshe; #17330.1

Family 

Zhou had three wives and ten children. He's the younger brother of M. D. Chow.

References

Further reading 

Collection of essays celebrating his 60th birthday 

1891 births
1984 deaths
Politicians from Yangzhou
Mayors of Tianjin
Businesspeople from Jiangsu
Chinese book and manuscript collectors
People's Republic of China politicians from Jiangsu
Vice Chairpersons of the National Committee of the Chinese People's Political Consultative Conference